British Rail Class D3/5 was a shunting locomotive built by British Rail at their Darlington Works in England. It was a diesel powered locomotive in the pre-TOPS period and the class was numbered 13152–13166 (later renumbered D3152-D3166).

They were similar to Class D3/4 (TOPS Class 10, numbers 13137–13151 / D3137–D3151), but had electrical equipment from British Thomson-Houston rather than GEC. All fifteen locomotives were withdrawn between February and December 1967.

Specification

 Wheel arrangement: 0-6-0 shunter
 Introduced: 1955
 Builder: British Railways
 Engine: Blackstone ER6T of 
 Transmission: 
 Electric, British Thomson-Houston (Class D3/5)
 Electric, General Electric Company plc (Class D3/4)

See also

List of British Rail classes

Sources
 

D003.05
C locomotives
Railway locomotives introduced in 1955
Scrapped locomotives
Standard gauge locomotives of Great Britain
Diesel-electric locomotives of Great Britain